"The Animal Song" is a song by Australian pop music duo Savage Garden, released a single on 23 February 1999. The song was written for the soundtrack of the film The Other Sister and also appeared on their second studio album, Affirmation (1999), as well as their compilation album, Truly Madly Completely: The Best of Savage Garden. It was the band's first song to be produced by Walter Afanasieff, a producer well known for his work with Mariah Carey. Afanasieff would later produce the group's Affirmation album, and also Darren Hayes' first solo album, Spin.

Background
The video for the song was directed by Jim Gable. It features Hayes walking through a parade, with intercut scenes from The Other Sister with Juliette Lewis. The song is also used in the "Shamu Rocks" seasonal nighttime show at SeaWorld, America. "The Animal Song" became the group's third Canadian number one single, topping the singles chart for three weeks, from 27 March 1999. It also peaked at number three in Australia and New Zealand, number 19 in the United States, and number 16 on the UK Singles Chart.

In June 2015, singer Darren Hayes explained that Savage Garden had been offered to record a song for Runaway Bride. However they passed up on the proposal and instead chose to compose a song "for the film that flopped". Daniel Jones described "The Animal Song" as a "transitional song" between their first and second albums and a "fun song that made you feel good".

The lyrics of the song deal with the struggles experienced by individuals suffering from mental illnesses, and more generally with the difficulty in expressing one's emotions and finding compassion in a confusing world that stultifies individuals with all kinds of rules. According to Darren Hayes, his longing for life in the tropical climes of Australia while living in the United States provided further inspiration for the lyrics.

Track listings

Australia
CD single
 "The Animal Song" (radio edit)
 "The Animal Song" (album version)
 "Santa Monica" (Bittersweet remix)

United States and Canada
CD and cassette single
 "The Animal Song" (album version) – 4:40
 "Santa Monica" (Bittersweet remix) – 5:00

United Kingdom
CD1
 "The Animal Song" (radio edit) – 3:41
 "Carry on Dancing" (Ultra Violet mix) – 6:44
 "The Animal Song" (instrumental) – 4:17

CD2
 "The Animal Song" – 4:40
 "All Around Me" – 4:09
 "Break Me Shake Me" (Broken mix) – 4:18

Cassette single
 "The Animal Song"
 "All Around Me"

Europe
CD1
 "The Animal Song" – 3:50
 "Santa Monica" (Bittersweet remix) – 5:00

CD2
 "The Animal Song" (radio edit) – 3:50
 "Carry on Dancing" (Ultra Violet mix) – 6:44
 "The Animal Song" (instrumental) – 4:40
 "All Around Me" – 4:09
 "Break Me Shake Me" (Broken mix) – 4:18

Japan
CD single
 "The Animal Song" – 4:40
 "The Animal Song" (radio edit) – 3:43
 "The Animal Song" (7-inch vocal mix) – 4:21
 "The Animal Song" (instrumental version) – 4:42
 "The Animal Song" (a cappella) – 3:46

Charts

Weekly charts

Year-end charts

Decade-end charts

Certifications

Release history

References

1998 songs
1999 singles
APRA Award winners
ARIA Award-winning songs
Savage Garden songs
Song recordings produced by Walter Afanasieff
Songs written by Daniel Jones (musician)
Songs written by Darren Hayes
Songs written for films
Songs about mental health